The Wilmington, Onslow and East Carolina Railroad was incorporated by the North Carolina General Assembly in 1885 and existed until 1893, when it was merged into the Wilmington, Newbern and Norfolk Railroad. It eventually became part of the Atlantic Coast Line Railroad.

References

Predecessors of the Atlantic Coast Line Railroad
Defunct North Carolina railroads
Railway companies established in 1885
Railway companies disestablished in 1893